Cameraria bauhiniae is a moth of the family Gracillariidae. It is known from India (West Bengal, Maharashtra and Karnataka).

The wingspan is 5.3-5.9 mm.

The larvae feed on Bauhinia acuminata and Bauhinia purpurea. They mine the leaves of their host plant. The mine is placed either on the upper or lower side of the leaf, usually on the space between veins. It is flat or very slightly tentiform when completed. Pupation takes place within a thin, whitish cocoon placed inside the mine. The cocoon is nearly orbicular

References

Cameraria (moth)
Moths of Asia

Lepidoptera of India
Leaf miners
Taxa named by Henry Tibbats Stainton
Moths described in 1856